Workitu Ayanu Gurmu (born 19 April 1987, in Addis Ababa) is an Ethiopian runner who specializes in the 5000 metres.

Workitu started her career in the junior races at the IAAF World Cross Country Championships, finishing fourth in the junior women's race in 2004 and finishing sixth at both the 2005 and 2006 editions. She began running in road races in 2008 and she won the Egmond Half Marathon in 2009; her time of 1:16:33 was enough to beat Hilda Kibet to the finish line. She competed in the IAAF World Half Marathon Championships for the first time in 2009, and finished in 14th place overall. She ran a marathon personal best of 2:29:25 at the 2010 Paris Marathon, finishing in fifth place.

As the 2010 edition had been cancelled, she attempted to defend her title at the 2011 Egmond Half Marathon. She came close to repeating the feat but ended up in second place, three seconds behind fellow Ethiopian Abebech Afework. She was close to her best at the 2011 Rome City Marathon, recording a time of 2:29:37, which brought her sixth position overall.

Achievements

Personal bests
1500 metres - 4:19.03 min (2005)
3000 metres - 8:48.65 min (2006)
5000 metres - 14:50.15 min (2007)
10,000 metres - 31:59.94 min (2005)
Half marathon - 1:10:13 hrs (2010)
Marathon - 2:29:25 hrs (2010)

References

External links
 

1987 births
Living people
Ethiopian female long-distance runners
Ethiopian female marathon runners
Athletes from Addis Ababa
Athletes (track and field) at the 2007 All-Africa Games
African Games competitors for Ethiopia
21st-century Ethiopian women